The Sasanoa River is an  tidal channel in the Midcoast region of Maine, connecting the Kennebec River with the Sheepscot River.

The Sasanoa River has two distinct sections. The western section begins at the Kennebec River opposite the city of Bath and runs east, forming the boundary between the towns of Arrowsic and Woolwich, and passing through its narrowest channel at Upper Hell Gate. The western section ends at Hockomock Bay, a water body also crossed by the Back River and containing numerous tidal inlets. This section of the river forms the boundary between Lincoln and Sagadahoc counties, as well as between the towns of Westport and Georgetown.

See also
List of rivers of Maine

References

Maine Streamflow Data from the USGS
Maine Watershed Data From Environmental Protection Agency

Rivers of Maine